Paul Pastur (7 February 1866 – 8 June 1938) was a Belgian lawyer and politician from Hainaut. He obtained a law degree of the University of Liège, and started working at the bar of Charleroi in 1893.

Pastur was born on 7 February 1886 in Marcinelle, Belgium. Impressed by the riots of 1886, he became involved in defending the 27 workmen supposedly implied in the Great Plot. In 1892, together with Jules Destrée, he founded the Democratic Federation. He devoted himself to more egalitarian education and in 1903 he founded the Université du Travail in Charleroi. In 1927, he introduced Mother's Day in Belgium, based on the American example. Paul Pastur was a freemason.

References

External links
 Université du Travail

1866 births
1938 deaths
Politicians from Charleroi
Belgian socialists
University of Liège alumni
Walloon movement activists
20th-century Belgian lawyers